Bursera cerasifolia is an uncommon  North American species of trees in the Frankincense Family in the soapwood order. It has been found only in the State of Baja California Sur in northwestern Mexico.

Bursera cerasifolia is a shrub or small tree 4–8 meters tall. Leaves are simple (not compound), 4–6 cm long, usually crowded together at the tips of branches. Drupes are hairless and egg-shaped.

References

cerasifolia
Flora of Baja California Sur
Endemic flora of Mexico
Plants described in 1891
Taxa named by Townshend Stith Brandegee